Stadio Comunale "Is Arenas" is a sports stadium in Quartu Sant'Elena, Sardinia, Italy. It is mostly used for football games and was the home venue of Serie A club Cagliari Calcio for the 2012–13 season.

The stadium is currently under renovation after Cagliari relocated out of their former home venue, Stadio Sant'Elia, in order to make it comply with Serie A league standards in time for the new season.

History

Origin 
Like most of Italian stadiums, it is owned by the local council, the municipality of Quartu Sant'Elena.
In the 1980s, Quartu Sant'Elena's local team (Sant'Elena) played its home games in the ground in Serie C2.

Renovation 
In 2012, Cagliari Calcio relocated to the stadium due to the Sant'Elia's unavailability. The stadium was a simple pitch with a concrete stand. It was expanded and it now has a capacity of 16,200 seats. Renovation works are planned to cost €1.2 million and last for five months. After the renovation it will have 11 Sky Boxes, a HD megascreen and a modern café.

Structure 
Three quarters of the stadium consists of temporary stands in steel tubes. The main stand is made of steel and prefabricated elements and is completely covered. There are five lighting towers for overall illumination of 1400 lux. The playing field consists of natural grass, with grafts of Cynodon dactylon and Paspalum vaginatum, ideal at the temperature of 25 °C.

References 

Is Arenas
Cagliari Calcio